Samuel M. Bailey (January 29, 1924 – September 21, 2010) was an American football, basketball, and baseball coach. He served as the head football coach at the University of Tampa from 1964 to 1967, compiling a record of 16–20–1. He was also school's head basketball coach from 1950 to 1955, tallying a mark of 45–66, and head baseball coach from 1961 to 1964, amassing a record of 55–53–1. Bailey played college football at the University of Georgia and was drafted by the Philadelphia Eagles in the 1946 NFL Draft.

Head coaching record

Football

References

1924 births
2010 deaths
American football ends
Basketball coaches from Florida
Georgia Bulldogs football players
Tampa Spartans athletic directors
Tampa Spartans baseball coaches
Tampa Spartans football coaches
Tampa Spartans men's basketball coaches
People from Sanibel, Florida
Players of American football from Florida